Kirtiman Singh Basnyat was Mul Kaji (Chief Minister) of the Royal Court of Nepal between 1794 and his death on 28 September 1801. He was a military commander of the Nepalese Army.

Military career
He fought in the Sino-Nepalese War and various other campaigns. In his first Battle, he fought from the Kerung Axis under the leadership of Kaji Balbhadra Shah along with Amar Singh Thapa (Sardar), Bhotu Pande and in the second battle from the Kharta Axis.

Court Politics
In 1794, King Rana Bahadur Shah came of age, and his first act was to re-constitute the government such that his uncle, Chief Chautaria Bahadur Shah of Nepal, had no official part to play. After removal of Bahadur Shah of Nepal, he was appointed as Chief (Mul) Kaji among the four Kajis though Damodar Pande was the most influential Kaji. Kirtiman had succeeded Abhiman Singh Basnyat as Chief Kaji. He was also a favorite of the Regent Subarna Prabha Devi. He was secretly assassinated on 28 September 1801, by the supporters of Raj Rajeshwari Devi. Another Kazi Damodar Pande was accused of the murder charges. In the resulting confusion many courtiers were jailed, while some executed, based solely on rumors. Bakhtawar Singh Basnyat, brother of assassinated Kirtiman Singh, was then given the post of MulKaji.

References

Footnotes

Notes

Bibliography

Nepalese military personnel
Basnyat family
Nepalese generals
1801 deaths
People of the Nepalese unification
1760 births
18th-century Nepalese nobility